The Bonfoy–Barstow House is a historic house located at 485 East Main Street in West Winfield, Herkimer County, New York.

Description and history 
It was built in 1888, and consists of a square front block with rear addition. They are of frame construction with gable roofs. The front block is  stories, two bays by two bays. The rear addition was originally a two-story, two-bay-wide block with a one-story shed roofed wing. That shed roofed wing was expanded to two-stories in the 1940s. Also on the property is a contributing carriage house. It is an example of late-19th century, middle class vernacular architecture.

It was listed on the National Register of Historic Places on August 24, 2011.

References

Houses on the National Register of Historic Places in New York (state)
Houses completed in 1888
Houses in Herkimer County, New York
National Register of Historic Places in Herkimer County, New York